The Bayview Bridge is a cable-stayed bridge bringing westbound U.S. Route 24 (US 24) over the Mississippi River. It connects the cities of West Quincy, Missouri and Quincy, Illinois. Quincy Memorial Bridge serves Eastbound US-24. The bridge was built at a cost of $32 million, $3 million over budget.

Rationale for construction
During the 1980s, it was decided that the Quincy Memorial Bridge, though still structurally sound, was insufficient for traffic. Therefore, the Bayview Bridge was built to alleviate traffic over the older bridge. It was built before the extension of Interstate 72 (I-72) west into Hannibal, Missouri. Traffic levels increased when the existing downstream US 36 bridge over the Mississippi River was closed to make room for the new I-72 bridge.

See also
List of crossings of the Upper Mississippi River

References

 . Retrieved January 14, 2006.
 Weeks III, John A. "US-24 Quincy Bayview & Memorial Bridges Quincy, MO" [sic]. http://www.johnweeks.com/upper_mississippi/pagesB/umissB13.html. Retrieved January 14, 2006.
Modjeski and Masters. "Bayview". https://web.archive.org/web/20051221194459/http://www.modjeski.com/projects/servproj/bayview.htm. Retrieved January 14, 2006.
 Unknown. "Should we build a new bridge?" WQAD. November 26, 2003. Retrieved January 14, 2006.

Cable-stayed bridges in the United States
Bridges over the Mississippi River
Towers in Illinois
Road bridges in Illinois
Bridges of the United States Numbered Highway System
Road bridges in Missouri
Towers in Missouri
Quincy–Hannibal area
Bridges completed in 1987
U.S. Route 24
Buildings and structures in Quincy, Illinois
Buildings and structures in Marion County, Missouri
1987 establishments in Missouri
1987 establishments in Illinois
Bridges in Adams County, Illinois
Interstate vehicle bridges in the United States